This is a list of drafted Djurgårdens IF players, players who have been drafted in the National Hockey League (NHL) Entry Draft and played the season prior to the draft for the Djurgården ice hockey organization. There have been 74 players drafted in the NHL Entry Draft from the Djurgården organization. This ranks second in Sweden and fourth in Europe. The first Djurgården player to be picked was Sören Johansson in the 1974 NHL amateur draft, he was also the third Swede overall to be picked in a NHL draft.

Drafted players

Footnotes

References

Players Selected In The Nhl Entry Draft
 
Lists of players selected in the NHL Entry Draft